Frédéric Lipka (born 14 March 1968) is a French former competitive figure skater. Competing in men's singles, he won the 1988 French national title and placed 11th at the 1988 European Championships. He later competed in pair skating, winning the 1993 French national title with Marie-Pierre Leray.

After retiring from competition, he worked for TF1 and then in the insurance industry. As of April 2011, he is the director-general of Assurances Banque populaire prévoyance.

Competitive highlights

Men's singles

Pairs with Leray and Gras

References 

1968 births
French male single skaters
French male pair skaters
Living people